Nanshao station is a station on the Changping Line of the Beijing Subway.

The station opened on December 30, 2010. The station was the terminus of the line until the extension to Changping Xishankou on December 26, 2015.

Station Layout 
The station has an underground island platform.

Exits 
There are 5 exits, lettered A, B1, B2, C1, and C2. Exits A and C2 are accessible.

References

External links

Beijing Subway stations in Changping District
Railway stations in China opened in 2010